Ann Carter "Bootsie" Calhoun (March 16, 1923 – February 21, 2014) was an American politician.

Born in Atlanta, Georgia, Calhoun graduated from the University of Georgia. Calhoun served on the Richmond County, Georgia Board of Education for eight years. She then served in the Georgia House of Representatives as a Republican in 1975.

Notes

External links

1923 births
2014 deaths
Politicians from Atlanta
Politicians from Augusta, Georgia
University of Georgia alumni
School board members in Georgia (U.S. state)
Women state legislators in Georgia (U.S. state)
Republican Party members of the Georgia House of Representatives
21st-century American women